Mahmoud Ismail El-Nigero (date of birth and death unknowns) was an Egyptian football forward who played for Egypt in the 1934 FIFA World Cup. He also played for Cairo Shourta Police.

References

Egyptian footballers
Egypt international footballers
Association football forwards
1934 FIFA World Cup players
Ittihad El Shorta SC players
Year of birth missing